Amantes e Mortais (known in English as Fast and Far) is Adelaide Ferreira's second album released in 1989.

Track listing

Portuguese Version

 Amantes e Mortais
 Vem Dançar
 Dava Tudo
 Na Maior
 Marlene
 São Loucos
 Sem Medos
 Quem não vê caras
 Carrie
 O Regresso do Sr. Rubirosa

English Version

 Fast and Far 
 Running Forever
 All the tears that we cried 
 Sammy 
 Silent Words 
 Crazy 
 Stranger 
 Monty Carlo
 Carrie
 The Return of Mr. Rubirosa

1989 albums
Adelaide Ferreira albums